Zbigniew Czech (born 30 March 1970 in Białystok) is a Polish civil servant who serves as an permanent representative  to the United Nations Office at Geneva since January 2018.

Zbigniew Czech has graduated from law at the University of Warsaw, branch in Bialystok (1994) as well as postgraduate Latin American studies at the University of Warsaw (1995) and on international security policy at the Institut des hautes études de défense nationale in Paris (2014).

He started diplomatic career in 1995 at the Legal and Treaty Department at the Ministry of Foreign Affairs. He has been working at the Permanent Delegation of the Republic of Poland to NATO and WEU in Brussels (1999–2003) and NATO headquarters in Brussels as legal adviser and prive officer of the Secretary General of NATO (2003–2006). In 2009 he became deputy director of the Legal and Treaty Department (MFA), and in 2012 acting director of the Dearment of the Amecias. Between 2012 and 2014 he was deputy chief of Embassy of Poland in Paris. In 2016 he was promoted to the director of the United Nations and Human Rights Department.

In January 2018 he was appointed as Permanent Representative of the Republic of Poland to the UN Office in Geneva.

He can speak English, French, Spanish and Russian languages. He is married with four daughters.

References 

21st-century Polish lawyers
1970 births
Living people
People from Białystok
Permanent Representatives of Poland to the United Nations
University of Warsaw alumni